Nikolay Mihaylov (born 8 April 1988) is a Bulgarian racing cyclist, who last rode for Bulgarian amateur team KK Drag. He rode at the 2014 UCI Road World Championships.

Major results
Source: 

2010
 3rd Road race, National Road Championships
2011
 1st  Time trial, National Road Championships
 4th Overall An Post Rás
1st Stage 3
2012
 1st  Time trial, National Road Championships
 3rd Overall Dookoła Mazowsza
2013
 3rd Time trial, National Road Championships
 6th Overall Tour de Serbie
 9th Overall Sibiu Cycling Tour
2014
 1st  Road race, National Road Championships
 1st Stage 3a (TTT) Sibiu Cycling Tour
 1st Stage 1 (TTT) Dookoła Mazowsza
 7th Overall Tour de Serbie
2015
 National Road Championships
1st  Time trial
1st  Road race
 7th Overall Sibiu Cycling Tour
2016
 1st  Overall Sibiu Cycling Tour
1st Stage 2
 2nd Time trial, National Road Championships
 3rd Overall Bałtyk–Karkonosze Tour
 4th Overall Tour de Serbie
2017
 1st  Road race, National Road Championships
 7th Overall Tour of Bulgaria – North
 7th Overall Tour of Bulgaria – South
2018
 1st  Road race, National Road Championships
 3rd Overall Sharjah International Cycling Tour
 8th Prueba Villafranca de Ordizia
2019
 4th Overall In the Steps of Romans

References

External links
 
 
 
 

1988 births
Living people
Bulgarian male cyclists
People from Svilengrad
European Games competitors for Bulgaria
Cyclists at the 2015 European Games
Sportspeople from Haskovo Province